was the seventh of nine post stations along the Minoji. It is located in the present-day city of Ōgaki, Gifu Prefecture, Japan. In addition to serving as a post station, it was also a castle town for Sunomata Castle. Sandwiched between the Nagara and Ibi rivers, it was an active post station.

History
The area flourished as a post station even before the establishment of the Minoji. During the Muromachi period, the town was a stop on the Kamakura Kaidō, which connected Kyoto with Kamakura. Ruins of the honjin and sub-honjin can still be seen in the city.

Neighboring post towns
Minoji
Okoshi-juku - Sunomata-juku - Ōgaki-juku

References

Post stations in Gifu Prefecture